Mullivaikkal massacre was the mass killing of tens of thousands of Sri Lankan Tamils in 2009 during the closing stages of the Sri Lankan Civil War ending in May 2009 in a tiny strip of land in Mullivaikkal, Mullaitivu. The Sri Lankan government designated a no fire zone in Mullivaikkal towards the end of the war. According to the UN, between 40,000–70,000 entrapped Tamil civilians were killed by the actions of Government Forces and LTTE, with the large majority of these civilian deaths being the result of indiscriminate shelling by the Sri Lankan Armed Forces.

During the battle government forces heavily shelled the area, including hospitals, UN hub and near the Red Cross ship, while the LTTE held hostage much of the civilian population for cover, and enforced this by shooting escaping Tamil civilians.

The UN Panel Report describes how "from as early as 6 February 2009, the SLA continuously shelled within the area that became the second NFZ, from all directions, including land, air and sea. It is estimated that there were between 300,000 and 330,000 civilians in that small area. The SLA assault employed aerial bombardment, long-range artillery, howitzers and MBRLs as well as small mortars, RPGs and small arms fire, some of it fired from a close range. MBRLs when using unguided rockets are area saturation weapons and when used in densely populated areas, are indiscriminate with potential to cause large numbers of casualties.

The UN Panel Report describes the actions of the LTTE, "In spite of the futility of their military situation, the LTTE not only refused to surrender, but also continued to prevent civilians from leaving the area, ensuring their continued presence as a human buffer. It forced civilians to help build military installations and fortifications or undertake other forced labour. It also intensified its practice of forced recruitment, including of children, to swell their dwindling ranks. As LTTE recruitment increased, parents actively resisted, and families took increasingly desperate measures to protect their children from recruitment. They hid their children in secret locations or forced them into early arranged marriages. LTTE cadre would beat relatives or parents, sometimes severely, if they tried to resist the recruitment. All these approaches, many of them aimed at defending the LTTE and its leadership, portrayed callousness to the desperate plight of civilians and a willingness to sacrifice their lives."

See also 

 Fighting in the No Fire Zone

References

External Links

 Remember Mullivaikkal

Human rights abuses in Sri Lanka
Mass murder in 2009
Mass murder of Sri Lankan Tamils